Arnold Sjöstrand (30 June 1903 – 1 February 1955) was a Swedish actor and film director. He appeared in more than 30 films between 1931 and 1952.

Selected filmography

 The Girl from Värmland (1931)
 It Pays to Advertise (1936)
 The People of Bergslagen (1937)
 Blossom Time (1940)
Home from Babylon (1941)
 The Talk of the Town (1941)
 Only a Woman (1941)
 If I Could Marry the Minister (1941)
 The Heavenly Play (1942)
 The Yellow Clinic (1942)
 I Killed (1943)
 The Sin of Anna Lans (1943)
 The Brothers' Woman (1943)
 Count Only the Happy Moments (1944)
 The Rose of Tistelön (1945)
 Incorrigible (1946)
 Two Women (1947)
 No Way Back (1947)
Sin (1948)
 Sunshine (1948)
 A Swedish Tiger (1948)
 Stronger Than the Law (1951)
 Encounter with Life (1952)

References

External links

1903 births
1955 deaths
Swedish male film actors
Swedish male stage actors
Swedish film directors
People from Sundbyberg Municipality
20th-century Swedish male actors